This is a list of numerical libraries, which are libraries used in software development for performing numerical calculations.  It is not a complete listing but is instead a list of numerical libraries with articles on Wikipedia, with few exceptions.

The choice of a typical library depends on a range of requirements such as: desired features (e.g. large dimensional linear algebra, parallel computation, partial differential equations), licensing, readability of API, portability or platform/compiler dependence (e.g. Linux, Windows, Visual C++, GCC), performance, ease-of-use, continued support from developers, standard compliance, specialized optimization in code for specific application scenarios or even the size of the code-base to be installed.

Multi-language

C

C++

Delphi
 ALGLIB - an open source numerical analysis library.

.NET Framework languages C#, F#, VB.NET and PowerShell

Fortran

Java

 SuanShu is an open-source Java math library. It supports numerical analysis, statistics and optimization.

Perl
 Perl Data Language gives standard Perl the ability to compactly store and speedily manipulate the large N-dimensional data arrays. It can perform complex and matrix maths, and has interfaces for the GNU Scientific Library, LINPACK, PROJ, and plotting with PGPLOT. There are libraries on CPAN adding support for the linear algebra library LAPACK, the Fourier transform library FFTW, and plotting with gnuplot, and PLplot.

Python

Others
 XNUMBERS – multi-precision floating-Point computing and numerical methods for Microsoft Excel.
 INTLAB – interval arithmetic library for MATLAB.

See also
 List of computer algebra systems
 Comparison of numerical-analysis software
 List of information graphics software
 List of numerical-analysis software
 List of optimization software
 List of statistical software

References

External links
 The Math Forum - Math Libraries, an extensive list of mathematical libraries with short descriptions

Numerical analysis
Numerical analysis software
 
Libraries

ja:数値解析ソフトウェア